Kent Franklin Peterson (December 21, 1925 – April 27, 1995) was an American professional baseball player. The left-handed pitcher appeared in 147 games during all or part of eight seasons in Major League Baseball (1944, 1947–53) for the Cincinnati Reds and Philadelphia Phillies.

He then entered the United States Army and performed World War II military service, missing the full seasons of –46. Pitching for a second-division team, Peterson was able to win only 12 of 45 decisions over those three years, a winning percentage of .267. In , he won two games while losing 15, finishing third in the National League in games lost. That year Peterson also led the league in hit batsmen with six in only 137 innings pitched. In , his won–lost record improved to 4–5 in 30 games, but his earned run average rose to an ineffective 6.24. It would be Peterson's last full season in the majors.

In , the Reds sent Peterson him to the minor leagues for the first time in his pro career, and he posted a winning record for Triple-A Syracuse. He then played at the top level of the minors through 1956 before leaving baseball.

In the majors, Peterson posted a career record of 13 wins and 38 losses (.255) in his 147 MLB games on the mound, with seven complete games, one shutout (a five-hit, 1–0 triumph over the Cardinals on June 12, 1947), and five saves. In 420 innings pitched, he allowed 434 hits and 215 bases on balls, with 208 strikeouts. His career ERA was 4.95.

He was inducted into the Utah Sports Hall of Fame in 1977.

References

External links

1925 births
1995 deaths
Baltimore Orioles (IL) players
Baseball players from Utah
Cincinnati Reds players
Major League Baseball pitchers
People from Utah County, Utah
Philadelphia Phillies players
St. Paul Saints (AA) players
San Diego Padres (minor league) players
Syracuse Chiefs players
Tulsa Oilers (baseball) players
United States Army personnel of World War II